Marcus Mlynikowski (born 6 July 1992) is a German professional footballer who plays as a left-back for Danish club Middelfart Boldklub.

Career
On 12 August 2020, Mlynikowski joined Danish 1st Division club Fremad Amager. Mlynikowski was loaned out to Danish 2nd Division club Kolding IF for the rest of the season on 31 January 2022. On 20 July 2022, Mlynikowski joined Middelfart Boldklub.

References

External links
 
 

1992 births
Living people
Association football fullbacks
German footballers
SV Werder Bremen II players
Sportfreunde Siegen players
Berliner AK 07 players
Hertha BSC II players
Hertha BSC players
Chemnitzer FC players
Næstved Boldklub players
Fremad Amager players
Kolding IF players
Middelfart Boldklub players
3. Liga players
Regionalliga players
Danish 1st Division players
German expatriate footballers
German expatriate sportspeople in Denmark
Expatriate men's footballers in Denmark
People from Oranienburg
Footballers from Brandenburg